William Hutchinson (31 May 1864 – 18 December 1924) was an Australian politician.

He was born in Stawell to miner William Hutchinson and Mary McKay. He attended state school and then night school while working on his uncle's farm. He was a shop assistant in Murtoa until 1885, when he became a watchmaker and jeweller at Warracknabeal. On 7 September 1898 he married Janet Mackay, with whom he had four children. In 1902 he was elected to the Victorian Legislative Assembly as the member for Borung. A Country Liberal who opposed Thomas Bent, he was Minister of Water Supply and Agriculture from 1913 to 1915, Minister of Lands from 1915 to 1917, and Minister of Public Instruction and Forests from 1918 to 1920. He was defeated by a Victorian Farmers' Union candidate in 1920. Hutchinson, who had sold his Warracknabeal business in 1907 and resided in Melbourne, died in East Malvern in 1924. His nephew John Austin Gray was later a member of the Victorian Parliament.

References

1864 births
1924 deaths
Nationalist Party of Australia members of the Parliament of Victoria
Members of the Victorian Legislative Assembly
People from Stawell, Victoria